Fishpathogens.eu is a database created to store data on isolates of different fish pathogens and their sequences. The site was launched June 2009 with a database on Viral hemorrhagic septicemia virus. In spring 2010 the database was extended with a section on Infectious hematopoietic necrosis virus.

The goal of the database is to offer a platform for sharing of available information on isolates of fish pathogens and their sequences. We encourage laboratories from all around the world to submit data of fish pathogens isolated in their laboratory.

The database is funded through the FP6-2004-Food-3-A project EPIZONE and the European Commissions financial aid for running the European Community Reference Laboratory for Fish Diseases.

References

External links 
 

Fish diseases
Animal virology